I Carry You with Me (Te Llevo Conmigo) is a 2020 Spanish-language drama film directed by Heidi Ewing, from a screenplay by Ewing and Alan Page Arriaga. It stars Armando Espitia, Christian Vázquez, Michelle Rodríguez, Ángeles Cruz, Arcelia Ramírez and Michelle González.

It had its world premiere at the Sundance Film Festival on January 26, 2020, where it won both the NEXT Innovator and Audience Awards. It was released theatrically during the COVID-19 pandemic on June 25, 2021 by Sony Pictures Classics in the U.S., and on July 8, 2021 by Sony Pictures Mexico in Mexico. It was released on digital and Blu-ray on September 21, 2021.

Premise
Based on true love, this decades spanning romance begins in Mexico between an aspiring chef (Armando Espitia) and a teacher (Christian Vázquez). Their lives restart in incredible ways as societal pressure propels them to embark on a treacherous journey to New York City with dreams, hopes, and memories in tow.

Cast
 Armando Espitia as Iván
 Christian Vázquez as Gerardo
 Michelle Rodríguez as Sandra
 Ángeles Cruz as Rosa Maria
 Arcelia Ramírez as Madga
 Michelle González as Paola
 Raúl Briones as Marcos
 Pascacio López as César
 Luis Alberti as Cucusa

Production
The film is a co-production between Mexico and the United States, and was shot in Mexico City, Puebla City, Jilotepec, Zapotitlán, Lerma, and New York City.

Release
The film had its world premiere at the Sundance Film Festival on January 26, 2020. Shortly after, Sony Pictures Classics and Stage 6 Films acquired worldwide distribution rights to the film. The film was set to screen at the Tribeca Film Festival in April 2020, followed by a theatrical release on June 19, 2020, but both the festival and release were cancelled due to the COVID-19 pandemic.

The film screened at the New York Film Festival on October 2, 2020 and other festivals including AFI Fest, Hamptons, Morelia, Busan, Rome, Zurich, Athens, Bergen, and Golden Horse. After several postponed release dates were cancelled due to the COVID-19 pandemic, the film had an awards qualifying run starting December 4, 2020, and was scheduled to be released on January 8, 2021. However, it was pulled from the schedule and set for an undisclosed 2021 date. It was finally released in U.S. theaters on June 25, 2021 and Mexico theaters on July 8, 2021, where it debuted in the top 10 films at the box office.

Critical reception
The website's critics' consensus reads: "A remarkable feature debut for director Heidi Ewing, I Carry You with Me finds universally resonant themes in a specific, richly detailed time and place." On Metacritic, the film holds a rating of 76 out of 100, based on 23 critics, indicating "generally favorable reviews".

It was cited on several "Best Films of the Year" lists in both 2020 and 2021, including The Washington Post, The Salt Lake Tribune, Remezcla, The Film Stage, People en Español, Rolling Stone, The Hollywood Reporter, and TheWrap.

Accolades

References

External links
 
 
 I Carry You with Me at Sony Pictures Classics 

2020 films
2020 drama films
2020 independent films
2020 LGBT-related films
2020 romantic drama films
American LGBT-related films
American romantic drama films
Black Bear Pictures films
Gay-related films
LGBT-related romantic drama films
Mexican LGBT-related films
Mexican romantic drama films
Sony Pictures Classics films
Stage 6 Films films
Sundance Film Festival award winners
2020s American films
2020s Mexican films